Sir Martin Doughty (11 October 1949 – 4 March 2009) was the Chair of Natural England and a well-known figures in modern British conservation.

Biography 

Martin Doughty began his working career as a lecturer in Environmental Management at Sheffield Hallam University.

Subsequently he worked primarily in the public or voluntary sectors with roles such as Leader of Derbyshire County Council from 1992 until 2001. He was also a Board Member for the Countryside Agency (1999 – 2005) and was the Chair of English Nature before taking up his final position as Chair of Natural England.

He received a knighthood in 2001 for services to local government in Derbyshire, followed by Honorary Doctorates from Sheffield Hallam University in 2002, Cranfield University in 2005 and Derby University in 2006.

He died of cancer on 4 March 2009, aged 59.

References

External links
Sir Martin Doughty (1949 – 2009)

British environmentalists
Knights Bachelor
1949 births
2009 deaths